Pogonosoma is a genus of robber flies (insects in the family Asilidae). There are about 17 described species in Pogonosoma.

Species
These 17 species belong to the genus Pogonosoma:

 Pogonosoma albopilosum Meijere, 1913 c g
 Pogonosoma basifera (Walker, 1861) c g
 Pogonosoma beccarii Rondani, 1875 c g
 Pogonosoma bleekeri (Doleschall, 1858) c g
 Pogonosoma cedrusa Ricardo, 1927 c g
 Pogonosoma crassipes (Fabricius, 1805) c g
 Pogonosoma cyanogaster Bezzi, 1916 c g
 Pogonosoma dorsatum (Say, 1824) i c g b
 Pogonosoma funebris Hermann, 1914 c g
 Pogonosoma lugens Loew, 1873 c g
 Pogonosoma maroccanum (Fabricius, 1794) c g
 Pogonosoma minor Loew, 1869 c g
 Pogonosoma ridingsi Cresson, 1920 i c g b
 Pogonosoma semifuscum Wulp, 1872 c g
 Pogonosoma stigmaticum Wulp, 1872 c g
 Pogonosoma unicolor Loew, 1873 c g
 Pogonosoma walkeri Daniels, 1989 c g

Data sources: i = ITIS, c = Catalogue of Life, g = GBIF, b = Bugguide.net

References

Further reading

External links

 

Asilidae genera
Articles created by Qbugbot
Taxa named by Camillo Rondani